Mark Andrew Nichols (born 29 December 1965) is an English professional golfer.

Nichols was born on the Isle of Sheppey. He played on the European Tour in 1994 and 1995, and the second tier Challenge Tour from 1990 to 1993, and again in 1996. He appeared in just one major, the 1995 Open Championship at St Andrews, where he made the cut.

Since leaving the tour, Nichols works as a teaching professional, and is currently employed at Moscow City Golf Club.

Nichols played in two Challenge Tour events in 2010, the Kazakhstan Open and the M2M Russian Challenge Cup which was played at the Tseleevo Golf & Polo Club, where Nichols used to work as Director.

Results in major championships

Note: Nichols only played in The Open Championship.
"T" = tied

External links 

1965 births
Living people
English male golfers
People from the Isle of Sheppey
Sportspeople from Kent
European Tour golfers